Medhi is a village in the Palghar district of Maharashtra, India.

Medhi may refer to:

Given name
Medhi Benatia, (born 1987), Moroccan footballer
Medhi Bouzzine (born 1984), French pair skater

Surname
Bishnuram Medhi (1888–1981), Indian politician, minister and governor
Kaliram Medhi (1880–1954), Indian writer and essayist
Salien Medhi (died 2016), Indian lawyer and politician

See also
 Mehdi, an Arabic name